Code M is an Indian Hindi-language crime drama web series created and produced by Juggernaut Productions for ALT Balaji and ZEE5. The series stars Jennifer Winget, Rajat Kapoor, Seema Biswas and Tanuj Virwani.

Plot
The series revolves around an Indian Army Lawyer Monica Mehra who discovers a conspiracy plot during her investigation of a military encounter case.

The series starts with a flashback scene, where three military men (Maj. Shakti Mandappa, Maj. Gaurav Shekhawat and Maj. Ajay Paswan) are following two terrorists. After ambushing them, a gunfire battle ensues, where the two terrorists are killed with Maj. Paswan martyred.

At the nearby Indian Army base in Jodhpur, Rajasthan, after facing protests from locals disputing the military's characterization of a terrorist encounter as fake, the mother of the slain Indian asks for justice. After she immolates herself and suffers burns, the military establishment hires an Army lawyer (Monica Mehra) to probe the incident independently.

Monica is shown to be a fierce and unafraid individual, who just weeks away from her wedding, accepts the order for investigation upon the urge of the military head of the base, Col. Suryaveer Chauhan, who incidentally happens to be a family friend. Initially, Monica finds the incident an open-and-shut case.

However, after additional questioning of Shakti and Gaurav, she suspects them of wrong-doing. In reaction, the two hire Angad Sandhu as their counsel, who coincidentally happens to be Monica's ex-boyfriend. After a series of confrontations and mishaps, Monica and Angad team up together to learn the truth. After days of twists and turns, Monica confronts Gaurav, who under emotional distress, reveals the truth partly. Gaurav says that he and Shakti are gay and they love each other. Even after Shakti's marriage and kid, they continued to maintain their same-sex relationship by making sure they were stationed at the same base. Gaurav says that after Maj. Paswan learned of their truth, afraid that he may expose them one day, Shakti and Gaurav plot to kill him with a fake terrorist encounter as a ruse.

As the series ends, Shakti is taken into military police custody while Gaurav commits suicide. As Monica leaves for home, she remembers another detail that bothers her and returns to the base. She confronts Shakti to unveil the remaining truth and Shakti tells her that Col. Chauhan wanted purity in the military and asks her to confront him.

After setting up a routine conversation with Col. Chauhan, in a fit of rage, he admits that he directed Shakti and Gaurav to kill Ajay as he disapproved of his engagement with his daughter as Ajay belonged to a different caste that he felt were inferior to his. He blackmailed Shakti to commit this crime to protect his gay identity.

Monica finally exposes Col. Chauhan and admonishes him for wearing a military uniform that is meant to serve all irrespective of gender or societal status while committing such crimes. She brings forth his daughter, Gayatri, who slaps him and abandons him.

The series ends with a tribute to the brave men and women of the Indian armed forces.

Cast

Season 1 
 Jennifer Winget as Major Monica Mehra
 Tanuj Virwani as Legal Council Angad Sandhu
 Rajat Kapoor Col. Suryaveer Chauhan
Seema Biswas as, alleged terrorist, Asif's mother
Anisa Butt as Gayatri Chauhan
Madhurima Roy as Zeenat
Keshav Sadhna as Major Gaurav Shekhawat
Aalekh Kapoor as Major Shakti Mandappa
Meghana Kaushik as Serana, Shakti's Wife

Season 2 
 Jennifer Winget as Major Monica Mehra
 Tanuj Virwani as Legal Council Angad Sandhu
 Swanand Kirkire

Episodes

Series overview

Season 1

Season 2

Critical reception 
Writing in India Today Shweta Keshri has described the series as "Jennifer Winget and Tanuj Virwani-starrer Code M successfully connects with the audience. Also, with so many shows on men in uniform, it was a pleasant change to see a woman lead the way." Ruchi Kaushal for Hindustan Times wrote "Jennifer Winget makes an impressive debut on the digital platform as an army lawyer who delves into a high-profile case just days before her wedding." Priyakshi Sharma for Pinkvilla wrote "The 20-something minute episode does not waste a second. It is fast-paced and engaging from the word go."

References

External links 
 
 Code M on ALTBalaji
 Code M on ZEE5
 CODE M SEASON 2 on ALTBalaji
 Code M on Voot

2019 web series debuts
Indian drama web series
Hindi-language web series
ALTBalaji original programming
ZEE5 original programming